Chaudhary Sunil Singh is National President of Lok Dal, a political party which was founded by former Prime Minister of India late Charan Singh.

He is former member of Uttar Pradesh Legislative Council.

Early life & Political career

Ch. Sunil Singh was born on 1 January 1971 in Aligarh to Rajendra Singh who was former Cabinet Minister in Uttar Pradesh and Saroj Singh. He is an engineering graduate and has done Masters in Business Management.

He has also been the Member of Legislative Council  in the State of Uttar Pradesh State Assembly. He claims to be carrying on the political legacy of Charan Singh. The party's official electoral symbol is a "Khet Jotata hua Kisan" (a farmer ploughing a field); Singh is concerned about farmers and their wellbeing.

Support for Sh Mulayam Singh Yadav

Ch. Sunil Singh came forward to support Sh Mulayam Singh Yadav when later had a dispute with his son and then former  chief minister of Uttar Pradesh Akhilesh Yadav in January 2017.

Movie Production - Game of Ayodhya
Ch. Sunil Singh produced a controversial film that portrays sequence of events that happened during Babri Mosque demolition in Ayodhya. During release he had to face heavy protests from Right wing.

References

See also
 Election Commission of India
 Lok Dal

1971 births
Living people
Politicians from Aligarh
Bharatiya Lok Dal politicians
Members of the Uttar Pradesh Legislative Council